Charles Lees may refer to:
 Charles Lees (colonial administrator) (1837–1898), British military officer and colonial administrator
 Charles Lees (painter) (1800–1880), Scottish portrait painter
 Charles Herbert Lees (1864–1952), Bakerian Lecturer, 1908
 Charles Lees of the Lees baronets
 Charlie Lees (1887–1976), rugby league player

See also
 Charles Lee (disambiguation)